El profesor Valdez (English: Professor Valdez) is a Mexican telenovela produced by Televisa and broadcast by Telesistema Mexicano in 1962.

Cast 
Enrique Aguilar
Beatriz Aguirre
Miguel Arenas
Micaela Castejón
Raul Farell
Enrique Lizalde
Francisco Jambrina
Antonio Medellin
Ángel Merino
María Rojo

References

External links 

Mexican telenovelas
1962 telenovelas
Televisa telenovelas
1962 Mexican television series debuts
1962 Mexican television series endings
Spanish-language telenovelas